What I Really Mean is an album by Texas-based folk singer-songwriter Robert Earl Keen, released in the United States on May 10, 2005, by Koch Entertainment.

Track listing
All tracks written by Robert Earl Keen, except where noted.
"For Love" – 4:23
"Mr. Wolf and Mamabear" – 3:45
"What I Really Mean" – 3:46
"The Great Hank" – 4:51
"The Wild Ones" – 4:27
"Long Chain" (Jimmy Driftwood) – 5:31
"Broken End of Love" – 3:24
"The Dark Side of the World" – 4:52
"The Traveling Storm" – 4:27
"A Border Tale" (Featuring Ray Price) (traditional, José Lopez Alavez, Keen, Edward B. Marks) – 4:10
"Ride" (Robert Earl Keen, Bill Whitbeck) – 3:42

Chart performance

References

External links
Koch Entertainment album website

2005 albums
Robert Earl Keen albums